Vellarada is a border village situated in Thiruvananthapuram district in the state of Kerala, India. It is 42 km from Thiruvananthapuram.  It is the southernmost part of Kerala state, sharing its border with Tamil Nadu. Vellarada is said to be the threshold to the high-range areas of the eastern part of Thiruvananthapuram district. The southernmost point of Western Ghats in Kerala is near Vellarada.

Thousands of devotees from various parts of Tamil Nadu, Kerala, Andhra Pradesh and Karnataka visit the shrine during Lent every year.

Demographics
 India census, A total of 8285 families resides in Vellarada. Vellarada village had a population of 31839 with 15702 males and 16137 females. There is a positive sex ratio of 1027 existing in Vellarada. Literacy is at 87.78 %. The dominant religions in Vellarada are Hinduism and Christianity. The Scheduled Caste (SC) constitutes 5.82 % while Schedule Tribe (ST) was 0.78 % of the total population in Vellarada village.

Majority of the population practice agriculture, chiefly cash crops like rubber.

Administration

 From local self-government perspective, in the three-tier Panchayati Raj local self-government model, Vellarada Grama Panchayat falls in the Perumkadavila Block Panchayat of Thiruvananthapuram Jilla PanchayatPanchayath. The Vellarada Grama Panchayat , in turn, has 23 wards which are the smallest administrative unit.

 In the political map of the country, Vellarada falls into Parassala Legislative assembly constituency of Kerala state and Thiruvananthapuram (Lok Sabha constituency) of parliament of India.

 In revenue administration point of view Vellarada Village falls into Neyyattinkara taluk of Thiruvananthapuram district.
 In Law and Order perspective, Vellarada falls under Kerala Police's Thiruvananthapuram Rural police district. The station serves neighbouring villages of Kunnathukal and Amboori also. 
 In terms of registration, Vellarada has a Sub Registrar Office, that is under Department of Registration, Government of Kerala. However, Vellarada SRO doesn't have an independent vehicle registration code Parassala (KL -19).

Transportation

In the case of transportation Vellarada doesn't have direct rail connectivity or waterways connectivity. Roadways are the main and only mode of transportation.

Roadways 
The major roads passing through Vellarada are:

 The Hill Highway from Parassala to Nandarapadavu in Kasaragod
 The State Highway 3 (Kerala), i.e. the Nedumangad–Aralvaimozhi road made by Travancore kings that passes through Anappara in Vellarada 
 The Karamana–Vellarada Road

Public transport through road is entirely managed by KSRTC and TNSTC.

 Kerala State Road Transport Corporation (KSRTC) connects Vellarada directly with district headquarters Thiruvananthapuram, Neyyattinkara, Parassala, Kattakada, Nedumangad and distant towns such as Kottayam, Erattupetta and Kottarakkara. There are no private buses operating through Vellarada.
 Tamil Nadu State Transport Corporation (TNSTC) has only a very few services through Vellarada. TNSTC connects Vellarada directly with Kanyakumari, Thuckalay, Nagercoil, Thirunelveli, Madurai most of them connect to either Parassala or Marthandam. TNSTC is available in abundance from a nearby place called Panachamoodu which is a town that's partially in Kerala and partially in Tamil Nadu.

Railways 
The nearest railway stations from Vellarada are:
Parassala railway station - 13 km
Dhanuvachapuram railway station - 15 km
Neyyattinkara railway station - 17 km
Thiruvananthapuram Central railway station - 37 km
Eraniel railway station - 37 km

Airways 
The nearest airports are:
Trivandrum International Airport - 40 km
Tuticorin Airport - 151 km
Cochin International Airport - 260 km

Tourist attractions
Kali Mala
Thekkan Kurissumala
Chittar Dam and reservoir (in Tamil Nadu)
Neyyar Wild Life Sanctuary
Kottur Elephant Rehabilitation Center
Mayam Kadavu, Amboori

Health care 
 Vellarada Community Health Centre 
 Ruckmony Hospital, Vellarada
 CSI Medical College Karakonam

Educational institutions
 Velayudha panikkar memorial higher secondary school vellarada
 Seventh Day School
 Govt Ups Vellarada
 Easwara Vilasam Up School Koothali
 Govt Lps School Koothali
 Lms Lps Anchumaramkala
LMS LPS Manoor, Pattamthalakkal

Higher education institutes 
 CSI Medical College, Karakonam
 PRS Engineering College,Paliyodu - Vellarada
 UIT Arattukuzhi - Vellarada
 White Memorial Arts & Science College,Panachamoodu - Vellarada.

Religious 
Thekkan Kurisumala pilgrim center 
St pius church Kurisumala
Kalimala
Choondical Sree Bhadrakali Devi Temple
Kaliyikkal Sree Bhadrakaali Temple
Pachayam Sree Dharma shastha Temple
Chirathalakkal Sree Bhagavathy Temple
C S I vellarada (district & Area Church)
C S I Muttachal
C S I Churuli
C S I Manali
vencodu Sree Dharmasastha Temple
Soul Winning Church of India (SWCI), Karamoodu
New Life Bethel Church, Muttachal
Suvartha Prayer Hall, Panayadu

References

Villages in Thiruvananthapuram district